Jaap Beije (6 April 1927 – 7 August 2013) was a Dutch rower. He competed in the men's coxed four event at the 1952 Summer Olympics.

References

External links
 

1927 births
2013 deaths
Dutch male rowers
Olympic rowers of the Netherlands
Rowers at the 1952 Summer Olympics
People from Bodegraven
Sportspeople from South Holland